The 2022 K3 League is the third season of the K3 League as a semi-professional league and the third tier of South Korean football league system. The regular season is from 26 February to 29 October 2022. Gimpo FC, the defending champions, is unable to defend their title, as they have been promoted to the 2022 K League 2.

Cheonan City FC and Cheongju FC applied to be a member of the K League 2 from 2023.

Competition format 
This year, the competition features 16 teams, with each of them playing 30 matches at the end of the season. The 15th and 16th placed team are automatically relegated to K4 League, and the 1st and 2nd from K4 League, are automatically promoted to the 2023 season, replacing the K3-relegated teams. No championship play-offs will be held in the 2022 season, as the 2022 FIFA World Cup takes place between November and December, unviabilizing the realization of the play-offs in its usual period.

Promotion and relegation 
Teams relegated to the 2022 K4 League
 Pyeongtaek Citizen

Teams promoted from the 2021 K4 League
 Pocheon Citizen
 Siheung Citizen
 Dangjin Citizen

Teams

Foreign players

League table

Results

Matches 1-30

Promotion–relegation play-off 
The match will be played on 13 November 2022. The 3rd and 4th placed team from the 2022 K4 League will play for a spot in the 2023 K3 League against the 16-th placed team in the 2022 K3 League.

Winner

Topscorers 
As of 24 October 2022

See also 
 2022 Korean FA Cup
 2022 K League 1
 2022 K League 2
 2022 K4 League

References 

K3 League seasons
2022 in South Korean football